The Stockholm School of Economics (SSE; , HHS) is a private business school located in city district Vasastaden in the central part of Stockholm, Sweden. SSE offers BSc, MSc and MBA programs, along with PhD- and Executive education programs.

SSE's Master program in Finance is ranked no. 18 worldwide as of 2018. The Masters in Management program is ranked no. 7 worldwide by the Financial Times. QS ranked SSE no.26 among universities in the field of economics worldwide in 2012. The school is the only privately funded university in Sweden.

SSE is accredited by EQUIS and is a member of CEMS. SSE has founded sister organizations: SSE Riga in Riga, Latvia, and SSE Russia in St Petersburg and Moscow, Russia. It also operates the European Institute of Japanese Studies (Japanese, kanji: 欧州日本研究所, Japanese, romaji: Ōshū Nihon kenkyūjo), a research institute in Tokyo, Japan.

History 
The Stockholm School of Economics was founded in 1909 on private initiative as a response to rapid industrialization and a growing need for well educated businessmen and company managers and has maintained close ties with the business community ever since. The foundation followed a substantial donation in 1903 by Knut Agathon Wallenberg. The name handelshögskola (roughly "college of commerce") was a parallel to the German term Handelshochschule, used by a number of German institutions started in the years before, commencing with Handelshochschule Leipzig in 1898. The term högskola was at this time also established for specialised higher educational institutions outside the universities, such as the Royal Institute of Technology, (Kungl.) Tekniska högskolan, which bore that name from 1877.

While founded as a business school, the subject of economics featured prominently in the research and curriculum of the school from the beginning.

The most well known scholars of the Stockholm School of Economics are arguably the economists Eli Heckscher (professor of economics and statistics 1909–1929, professor of economic history 1929–1945), and Bertil Ohlin (professors of economics). Heckscher is also known as the founder of economic history as an independent academic discipline and his work Svenskt Arbete och Liv is a fundamental work within this subject.

Ohlin was also a leading figure within the school of doctrine with the same name, the so-called Stockholm school; a group of leading Scandinavian economists influenced by Knut Wicksell, most of them active in Stockholm, either at the Stockholm School of Economics or the Stockholm University College. This school of doctrine was to have a profound influence on post-WWII Swedish economic policy and the development of the modern Scandinavian Welfare state. Heckscher and Ohlin jointly developed the so-called Heckscher-Ohlin theory, the standard international mathematical model of international trade. Bertil Ohlin received the Nobel Prize in Economics in 1977 (shared with British economist James Meade). Other prominent members of the Stockholm school were the Stockholm University professor Gustav Cassel, who developed standard economic theory of Purchasing power parity and economist Dag Hammarskjöld, Secretary-General of the United Nations in New York City, United States.

The school is a full member of the Association of Professional Schools of International Affairs (APSIA), a group of schools of public policy, public administration, and international studies.

Academics

Admission 
For Master programmes, applicants have to have a GMAT score of over 600 and a TOEFL iBT score of over 100 in order to be considered suitable for applying.
In the academic year 2012/2013 the university received 3261 applications for the four Masters programmes which it offered at the time. Therefore, the according acceptance rate would have been low.

Grading 
SSE uses a 5-grading scale which includes the following, Excellent (5.0), Very Good (4.0), Good (3.5), Pass (3.0) and Fail (0.0). A Grade Point Average (GPA) is giving between 3.0 and 5.0. There is also a possibility to obtain an award, Outstanding Achievement, which implies that the student gets at least Excellent as final grade, and that it's the first time the student are taking the course. The person responsible for the course have the opportunity to award up to 10% of the students with Outstanding Achievement. The award does not impact the calculation of the student's Grade Point Average (GPA). Furthermore, the 10 percent of students with the highest GPA in the BSc programmes who complete the studies on time, that is, no later than three years after they were enrolled, receive the President's list award. Completion of studies on time entails having completed all courses in connection with the examination retake period in August at the latest.

Programmes 
Stockholm School of Economics offers the following programmes:
 Bachelor of Science (BSc) in Business and Economics
 Bachelor of Science (BSc) in Retail Management
 Master of Science (MSc) in Finance
 Master of Science (MSc) in Business & Management
 Master of Science (MSc) in  Accounting, Valuation & Financial Management
 Master of Science (MSc) in Economics
 Master of Science (MSc) in International Business
 Doctoral (PhD) Programme with three specializations (Business Administration, Economics, Finance)
 MBA Program (offered in executive format)

The educational programmes are mostly conducted in English. However, there are some elective courses given in Swedish at bachelor's- and master's programmes as well as the SSE Executive Education.

Bachelor's programmes

SSE Bachelor of Science in Business and Economics 
The Bachelor of Science in Business and Economics is a three-year program (180 ECTS credits). The BSc in Business and Economics is a program designed for students with an interest in a broad business education, including subjects as economics, finance, accounting, marketing, management, entrepreneurship, data analytics, business law and strategy. The program makes you eligible to study a MSc at the Stockholm School of Economics or another university in Sweden or abroad. Yearly, roughly 300 students are enrolled in the BE programme.

SSE Bachelor of Science in Retail Management 
The Bachelor of Science in Retail Management is a three-year program (180 ECTS credits). The BSc in Retail Management is a specialised program focused mainly on retailing. During the third year of the program students are taking an Applied retail track where theory and practice are combined. BSc in Retail Management makes you eligible to most of the MSc programmes at SSE and also other MSc programmes in Sweden or abroad. Compared to SSE's Business and Economics programme the Retail Management programme offers fewer student places, 60 opposed to 300.

Master's programmes

SSE Master of Science in Business and Management 
The Master of Science in Business and Management is a two-year program (120 ECTS credits). There are offered three specializations: International Business (CEMS), Management and Marketing & Media Management. Within their specialization, students write a Master's thesis worth 30 ECTS credits.

SSE Master of Science in Economics 
The MSc in Economics is a program designed for students with a background in economics or business. As well as the other master programs it is a two-year program with 120 ECTS. There are offered two specializations: Applied Economic Analysis and International Economics.

SSE Master of Science in Finance 
The MSc in Finance is a program designed for students with a background in finance or business. As well as the other master programs it is a two-year program with 120 ECTS. There are offered two specializations: Corporate Finance and Investment management.

SSE Master of Science in International Business 
The MSc in International Business is a two-year program targeting students who see the world as their home and is fully integrated with CEMS MIM. The current CEMS Club Board is represented by Martina Mariani, Sebastian Schaaf and Julia Gerwien. The MSc Program in International Business takes part in the FT Masters in Management ranking. The latest ranking placed the program 7th out of 100 participating top international business schools.

SSE Master of Science in Accounting, Valuation, and Financial Management 
The MSc in Accounting, Valuation, and Financial Management is also a two-year program (120 ECTS). After a core of four courses in the first semester, students are allowed to choose between a limited number of courses in the second semester. In the third semester, students may apply for an exchange program, an executive trainee program, or free choice of electives. In the fourth and final semester, students work in pairs on a thesis. Students may also apply for a double degree with a CEMS Msc in International Management degree.

MBA programme

SSE Masters of Business Administration (MBA), Executive Format 
The SSE EMBA program was launched in 2001. Since 2001, the year the Financial Times began its Executive MBA ranking, the SSE Executive MBA has been the first in the Nordic league. Worldwide its average rank in the last three years was 56.

PhD programmes

SSE PhD in Business Administration, Economics, Finance 
The SSE PhD Program was launched more than 60 years ago and has graduated more than 500 PhDs. There are three separate PhD programs at SSE:
Business Administration 
Economics 
Finance

Student life 

The Student Association at the Stockholm School of Economics (SASSE, ; abbreviated HHSS)  is the chief organ of student government at SSE. The student association is organized into eight committees with different responsibilities. The committees are the following:
The Business Committee (Näringslivsutskottet) (NU)
The Education Committee (Utbildningsutskottet) (UU)
The Entertainment Committee (Programutskottet) (PU)
The International Committee (Internationella utskottet) (IntU)
The Tech Committee (Techutskottet) (TechU)
The Media Committee (Mediautskottet) (MedU)
The Social Committee (Sociala utskottet) (SU)
The Sports Committee (Idrottsutskottet) (IdU)

Each committee is headed by a president, who is also a member of the board of the student association. Moreover, there is a president of the whole SASSE who are elected each year by the students at the school.

Alumni 
Stockholm School of Economics (SSE) alumni are defined as previous students that have graduated from one of SSE's degree programs. Today, there are some 14 000 alumni in this network. In addition to the alumni are the so-called SSE IFL Networkers, previous participants at IFL open or custom programs, these sum up to an additional 10 000.

SSE maintains contacts with its alumni in a number of different ways; both through direct and indirect contacts and through various types of communication channels. Contacts are administered through the SSE Alumni Office.

Today, many alumni are involved in the school's advisory board, the alumni association's board, the Student Association et al., all aligned to SSE activities. Even more alumni return to the School as guest lectures, or sponsors of course projects, as suppliers of internship opportunities, or as recruiters from large companies.

Currently, if an alumnus wishes to connect with another SSE graduate, they have five primary options:
1. Attending the alumni events arranged by SSE Alumni Office
2. Networking through the SSE Alumninet, a web portal open to holders of an SSE diploma. Alumninet had some 14 000 members as of January 2013, or through the official LinkedIn groups maintained by SSE
3. Membership in the Alumni Association of the Stockholm School of Economics – an alumni association sponsored and organized by alumni for Swedish-speaking graduates of SSE – or by joining the American Friends of SSE – an affiliated alumni group, based in the US.
4. Joining any of the unofficial alumni groups and networks, maintained by the alumni themselves, e.g. in the UK.

Noted alumni 

 Sebastian Siemiatkowski, co-founder and CEO of Klarna
 Jacob de Geer, co-founder and CEO of iZettle
 Dan T. Sehlberg, Author of novels MONA and SINON, founder and CEO of Sehlhall Fastigheter, CEO of Citat Group
 Inga-Britt Ahlenius
 Yegor Altman
 Jonas Andersson (swimmer)
 Magdalena Andersson, former prime minister of Sweden
 Alexander Bard
 Frank Belfrage
 Erik Berglöf
Thomas Berglund, former president and CEO of Securitas
 Inga Björk-Klevby
 Lars Calmfors
 Jan Carlzon, former CEO of SAS Group
 Claes Dahlbäck, former president and CEO of Investor AB, chairman of the board of Stora Enso, member of the board of Goldman Sachs
 Micael Dahlén
 Hans Dalborg, former CEO of Skandia, president and CEO of Nordbanken AB 1991–2004
 Ulf Dinkelspiel, former deputy minister of foreign affairs of Sweden
 Marie Ehrling, former deputy CEO of SAS and CEO of TeliaSonera Sweden
 Kristian Ek
 Henrik Ekelund
 Fredrik Eklund
 Klas Eklund
 Erik Engstrom, CEO of Reed Elsevier
 Gunvor Engström
 Ali Esbati
 Johan Forssell
 Christer Gardell
 Reinhold Geijer
 Philip Haglund
 Lars Heikensten, former governor of Sveriges Riksbank, the national bank of Sweden
 Stefan Ingves, incumbent governor of Sveriges Riksbank
 Jerker Johansson
 Olof Johansson, former acting minister for communications and former minister of the environment of Sweden
 Bill Keenan, author, and former professional hockey player
 Anna Kinberg Batra, member of the Riksdag, the parliament of Sweden
 Erik Lakomaa
 Staffan Burenstam Linder, former professor, inventor of the Linder hypothesis, former minister of trade of Sweden
 Lars Ljungqvist
 Per Olof Loof, CEO of KEMET Corporation
 Fredrik Lundberg, president and CEO of L E Lundbergföretagen AB
 Kristian Luuk
 Bertil Näslund
 Tobias Nielsén
 Lars Nittve, former director of Rooseum in Malmö, Tate Modern in London, Moderna Museet in Stockholm and present director of M+, a new museum of visual culture under construction in the West Kowloon Cultural District of Hong Kong, to open in 2018
 Kjell A. Nordström
 Ann-Christin Nykvist
 Mikael Odenberg, former minister of defence of Sweden
 Bertil Ohlin, professor of economics, developed the Heckscher–Ohlin model together with professor Eli Heckscher, founded the Stockholm school together with professor Gunnar Myrdal, leader of Folkpartiet (Liberal People's Party of Sweden) 1944–1967, Nobel laureate in economics in 1977
 Claudia Olsson, founder of Stellar Capacity
 Sydney Onayemi
 Eric M. Pless, Retired U.S. ARMY Lieutenant Colonel and Former U.S. Military Attache’ at U.S. Embassy Latvia 2008–2011, First U.S. Citizen EMBA Graduate from SSE RIGA in 2011. 
 Karin Pilsäter
 Mats Qviberg
 Ruben Rausing, founder of the liquid food packaging company Tetra Pak
 Bo Johan Renck
 Eric Rhenman
 Jonas Ridderstråle
 Karl Gustaf Scherman
 Mikael Schiller
 Suleyman Sleyman
 Agneta Stark
 Viveca Sten
 Charlotte Strömberg
 Oscar Swartz, founded Bahnhof, the first independent Internet service provider in Sweden
 Max Tegmark,  professor at the Massachusetts Institute of Technology
 Margaretha af Ugglas, former minister for foreign affairs of Sweden, daughter of Hugo Stenbeck, the founder of Investment AB Kinnevik
 Louise Wachtmeister
 Per Westerberg, chairman of the Riksdag, the Swedish parliament
 Anne Wibble, finance minister of Sweden 1991–1994, daughter of Bertil Ohlin
 Peter Wolodarski, editor-in-chief of Dagens Nyheter, the largest daily newspaper in Sweden, by circulation

Partner Universities
SSE has about 70 partner universities and each academic year, SSE sends over 180 students abroad on exchange and hosts over 180 exchange students from all over the world. The majority of the exchange places are part of the Master's program, but some places are offered at the Bachelor's level. The student exchange places are reserved for students from the SSE partner universities.

See also 
Student Association at the Stockholm School of Economics
Stockholm School of Economics in Riga
Stockholm School of Economics Russia
List of business schools in the Nordic countries

References

External links 

Stockholm School of Economics' home page
SSE MBA Executive Format in Stockholm
Affiliated research institutes

 
Business schools in Sweden
Universities in Sweden
Higher education in Stockholm
Educational institutions established in 1909
Economics schools
1909 establishments in Sweden